Nosran (also Romanized as Nosrān, Nasaran, and Nasrān; also known as Naşrand and Nosrand) is a village in Karkas Rural District, in the Central District of Natanz Town, Isfahan Province, Iran. At the 2006 census, its population was 257, in 67 families.

This village is located about 15 Km far from Natanz town. Most of the villagers are retired of Islamic Republic of Iran Railways or engaged in farming. This village is near the Espidan village, Mohamadabad farm, Aliabad farm and also Khodabandeabad farm.

Crops 
Pomegranates and figs are two important crops in the village of Nosran.

References 

Populated places in Natanz County